Samuel Pearson (1814–1884) was an English entrepreneur and founder of Pearson plc, a leading education (originally construction) company listed on the London Stock Exchange. His grandson Weetman Pearson was ennobled, making Samuel Pearson the ancestor of Viscount Cowdray.

Career
After working as a labourer, Pearson set up his own brickmaking and contracting business in Bradford in 1844. In 1856, he brought his son, George, into the business and in 1857 the business won an important contract for extension and refurbishment work on the Lancashire and Yorkshire Railway. By 1861 it was employing 9 men and a farmer. He retired in 1879 and died in Scholes in 1884.

References

Sources

1814 births
1884 deaths
Samuel